Beatrice "Trice" Capra (born April 6, 1992 in Ellicott City, Maryland) is an American tennis player who attended Duke University. Her highest WTA singles ranking is no. 201, which she reached on September 20, 2010.

She is the daughter of Giovanni and Laurie Capra. An Ellicott City native, she lives in The Woodlands, Texas. She attended Laurel Springs Online School for high school.

Tennis career

US Junior career
Capra earned the no. 1 ranking slots in the G14, G16, and G18 divisions. She was the girls 14's Easter Bowl Champion, G18s Spring National Champion, and was a two-time finalist at the G18s Clay Court National Championship. She represented the United States in Junior World Cup in G14s and G16s.

ITF Junior Tennis career
Competing in the international junior circuit, Capra earned a top-8 ITF ranking and was the Banana Bowl ITF champion, the Grade A Bonfiglio champion, and the Tulsa ITF champion. She reached the quarterfinal rounds of singles in the Junior US Open and the Junior French Open.

2010
Capra won a playoff tournament to receive a wild-card entry to her first Grand Slam tournament, the 2010 U.S. Open, where she reached the second round. She recorded her first top-20 win by defeating 18-seed Aravane Rezaï 7–5, 2–6, 6–3. In September 2010, Capra reached 201 in the WTA ranking, her highest mark.

World Team Tennis
Capra played for the Philadelphia Freedoms of the World Team Tennis Pro League during its 36th season; she was the only amateur in the league.

College tennis
She was a member of the women's tennis team at Duke University, where she was a three-time All-American, and a member of the 2012 ACC Championship Team and the 2014 National Indoor Championship Team. During her freshman year, she played the No. 1 position and went undefeated (11-0), just the second Duke tennis player to do so. She was named National Rookie of the Year, ACC Player of the Year, and ACC Tournament Most Valuable Player. She was a member of the Collegiate All Star Team, and represented the United States for the Master U tournament for collegiate tennis in 2012.

Personal
Capra is of Italian descent on her father's side, who is from Monza. Until the age of 18, she trained at the Evert Tennis Academy, run by former world no. 1 Chris Evert. At Duke University, she majored in cultural anthropology, minoring in sociology and getting her markets and management certificate.

References

External links

 
 
 Latest WTA Tour Results at YouPlayoff

1992 births
Living people
American female tennis players
American people of Italian descent
People from Ellicott City, Maryland
Sportspeople from the Baltimore metropolitan area
Duke Blue Devils women's tennis players
Tennis people from Maryland